Cameraria mendocinensis is a moth of the family Gracillariidae. It is known from California, United States.

The larvae feed on Quercus garryana and Quercus lobata. They mine the leaves of their host plant. Pupation takes place within the mine. It overwinters as a pupa.

References

Cameraria (moth)
Moths described in 1981

Moths of North America
Lepidoptera of the United States
Leaf miners
Fauna of California
Taxa named by Paul A. Opler
Taxa named by Donald R. Davis (entomologist)